The 2018 Yukon Men's Curling Championship was held January 11 to 14 at the Whitehorse Curling Club in Whitehorse, Yukon. The winning Thomas Scoffin team represented the Yukon at the 2018 Tim Hortons Brier, Canada's national men's curling championship.

Teams
Six teams entered the event:

Team Solberg Are The Defending Champions

Draw
Following new rules set out by the Yukon Curling Association, championships with 6-7 teams are to have a modified triple knock out format.

Brackets:

Playoffs
Since Team Solberg played in every qualifying game for the playoffs, Team Solberg earns the bye to the final

Semifinal
Sunday, January 14, 8:30 am

Game #2
Sunday, January 14, 2:30 pm

References

External links
Results on CurlingZone

2018 Tim Hortons Brier
Men's Curling Championship, 2018
Sport in Whitehorse
Men's Curling Championship
January 2018 sports events in Canada